"All Night" is a song recorded by American singer Beyoncé for her sixth studio album, Lemonade (2016). The song was written by Diplo, Beyoncé, Henry Allen, Timothy Thomas, Theron Thomas, Ilsey Juber, Akil King, and Jaramye Daniels. Diplo, Beyoncé, and Allen co-produced the track.

A reggae-tinged track, "All Night" features "sprinklings" of horns and strings in its instrumentation, while sampling the brass line from "SpottieOttieDopaliscious" written by OutKast (André Benjamin, Antwan Patton) and Sleepy Brown (Patrick Brown). The song was sent to Italian radio as the album's fifth single on December 2, 2016. Lyrically, the song focuses on forgiveness and rebuilding trust after infidelity, with the protagonist trying to rekindle the passion with her lover. The song's music video is part of a one-hour film with the same title as its parent album, originally aired on HBO which premiered in April 2016.

Critical response

The song received critical acclaim from critics upon release. Entertainment Weekly listed "All Night" at number 15 on their list of best songs of the year, with the editor Leah Greenblat commenting "It makes sense that a sweet, tender lullaby of a love song would garner less attention in the immediate wake of Mrs. Carter's firebomb Lemonade revelations, but it would be a shame to miss this low-key stunner, one of the all-time finest odes to a subject pop music hardly ever deigns sexy enough to address: long-term monogamy." Consequence of Sound included the song at number 38 on their year-end ranking and USA Today, at number 3. The song would later be voted in Village Voices Pazz & Jop the 46th best single of 2016.

Commercial performance

After the release of Lemonade, "All Night" debuted on the Billboard Hot 100 chart at number 38. The song also debuted on the Hot R&B/Hip-Hop songs chart at number 23. In overseas charts, although not being an official single, the song entered the top 10 in Sweden's digital charts. As of June, the song has sold 146,832 downloads in US.

Music video
The music video for the song was released to YouTube on November 30, 2016. The video features footage from Beyoncé's home movies, including her and Jay-Z's wedding day and spending family time with their first daughter, Blue Ivy. The video features Zendaya, Amandla Stenberg, Chloe and Halle, twin sister music duo Ibeyi and Quvenzhané Wallis.

Live performances
"All Night" was part of the set list of The Formation World Tour with the first performance taking place in Miami at the Marlins Park on April 27, 2016.

Charts

Weekly charts

Year-end charts

Certifications and sales

Release history

References

2016 songs
2016 singles
Beyoncé songs
Song recordings produced by Beyoncé
Songs written by Beyoncé
Songs written by Diplo
Song recordings produced by Diplo
Songs written by Theron Thomas
Songs written by Timothy Thomas
Torch songs
Songs written by Big Boi
Songs written by Ilsey Juber
Songs written by André 3000
Songs written by King Henry (producer)